Meru is a Bantu language spoken by the Meru people (Ameru) who live on the Eastern and Northern slopes of Mount Kenya and on the Nyambene ranges. They settled in this area after centuries of migration from the north.

The Meru people are a fairly homogeneous community and all share a common ancestry. They speak the same language, Kimeru, but there are some slight regional differences, in accent and local words. The community comprises the following subdivisions, from the north to south:
Igembe
Tigania (Tiania) (culture close to neighbouring Cushitic and Nilotic communities)
Imenti
Tharaka (Saraka)
Igoji
Mwimbi–Muthambi
Chuka (Gicuka) (marginal intelligibility with Meru proper and with Gikuyu.

As the Meru language is similar to its surrounding neighbors, the Kikuyu and Embu could have possibly adopted parts of Meru.

Sample phrases

Dialects
Kimeru has seven main mutually intelligible dialects. The dialects include kiimenti widely used by the Imenti section of the Ameru, Tiania/gitiania used by the tigania, kiigembe used by the Igembe, kimwimbi and Muthambi used by the Igoji and Chogoria, Gicuka used by the Chuka and Kitharaka used by the Tharaka.

Imenti dialect

It is the commonly used dialect in Meru. The dialect acts as the lingua franca between all the nine subtribes of Meru. It is the official dialect used in the Kimeru Bible translations. It is commonly used in Nkubu, Timau, Kibirichia, Meru town and Ruiri areas of Meru County.

Sample phrases

The Chuka, Muthambi and Mwimbi dialects

The dialects are more related to Gikuyu and Meru proper, and are common in Igoji, Chogoria and Chuka regions of Meru County and Tharaka Nithi County.

Sample phrases

Tigania and Igembe dialects

The dialects are mostly spoken in Miraa or Khat growing areas of Muthara, Karama, Kangeta, Maua, Laare and Mutuati in Meru County.

Sample phrases

Tharaka dialect

The dialect is more closely related to the Kamba and Tigania dialects. It is most common in Tharaka areas of Tharaka Nithi County.

Sample phrases

Alphabet
Kimeru is written in a Latin alphabet. It does not use the letters f  p  q  s  v  x  z, and adds the letters ĩ and ũ.
The Kimeru alphabet is:

In Media and Popular Culture
A Kenyan musical group known as High Pitch Band Afrika based in Meru County  has done a cover of the Luis Fonsi's popular hit single Despacito in Kimeru language. The Kimeru cover was uploaded on YouTube on July 10, 2017, and has generated over 500,000 views since then.

In Media the Kimeru language is used as the primary broadcast language of several Radio and TV stations in Kenya. Some include: Meru Fm, Muuga Fm, Weru Fm, Weru TV, Baite TV, Thiiri Fm among many others.

References

External links
Meru dictionary
PanAfrican L10n page on Meru
"page on Meru History

 
Northeast Bantu languages
Languages of Kenya